Cotherstone is a rural locality in the Central Highlands Region, Queensland, Australia.

Geography
The lower eastern part of the locality is used for crops and grazing on native vegetation.

History 

Education 
There are no schools in Cotherstone. The nearest primary and secondary schools are Dysart State School and Dysart State High School in neighbouring Dysart to the north-east.

References 

Central Highlands Region
Localities in Queensland